Stephanie Italia Ricci (born October 29, 1986) is a Canadian-American actress. She's known for starring as April Carver in the 2014–2015 ABC Family television series Chasing Life, and for playing White House Chief of Staff and Special Advisor Emily Rhodes in the television drama series Designated Survivor from 2016 to 2019.

Career
Ricci made her major acting debut in 2007, in the American Pie direct-to-video film, Beta House. She then went on to have a recurring role on the Disney XD series Aaron Stone. Ricci also appeared in the music video "Hate" by Plain White T's as the ex-girlfriend.

During 2009, Ricci began appearing in American productions with minor roles in How I Met Your Mother, House, and Greek. During that same year, she had a recurring role in the Comedy Central series Secret Girlfriend as Sasha. In 2010, she co-starred in the Cartoon Network live-action series Unnatural History as Maggie Winnock. She also appeared in a Clean & Clear commercial as herself. In 2011, she appeared in the short film Valediction. In 2013, Ricci appeared in a small role in Joseph Gordon-Levitt's directorial debut film Don Jon. 

From 2014 to 2015, she starred as April Carver in the ABC Family series Chasing Life. Ricci joined the cast of Supergirl in December 2015 as Siobhan Smythe / Silver Banshee. In September 2016, Ricci joined the ABC political drama Designated Survivor, as Emily Rhodes. The show was renewed by Netflix for a third season which was released on June 7, 2019. It was not renewed by Netflix for a fourth season.

She has also appeared in films for the Hallmark Channel, including Rome in Love and Love in Winterland.

In 2022, Ricci starred in The Imperfects as Dr. Sydney Burke. The ten-episode first season premiered on Netflix on September 8 in the United States.

Personal life
Italia Ricci was born Stephanie Ricci in Richmond Hill, Ontario, and is of Italian descent. She graduated from Queen's University, where she undertook charitable work for causes such as Water Can, a non-profit, creating waterholes in Africa. Ricci was a Stand Up To Cancer ambassador and supporter of the Ovarian Cancer Research Fund.

Ricci began dating Canadian actor Robbie Amell in July 2008. They became engaged on August 19, 2014, and were married on October 15, 2016. Their first child, a son, was born in September 2019. Ricci and Amell both became United States citizens in January 2020.

Filmography

Film

Television

References

External links
 
 
 

1986 births
21st-century Canadian actresses
21st-century American actresses
Actresses from Ontario
Canadian expatriate actresses in the United States
Canadian film actresses
Canadian people of Italian descent
Canadian television actresses
Canadian emigrants to the United States
American film actresses
American people of Italian descent
American television actresses
Living people
People from Richmond Hill, Ontario
Queen's University at Kingston alumni
People with acquired American citizenship